Sarzora is a village in the Salcete taluka (or sub-district) in the South Goa District of the Indian state of Goa. It is known for its village lake, sylvan settings, and is surrounded by hillocks.

Population
Its population was 1,911 in 488 households.

Lake
A village nestled amidst hillocks, it is known for its natural freshwater and rain-fed lake, which has been described as green and peaceful, and particularly suited for evening visits.

Location, vicinity
Sarzora is in the vicinity of Chinchinim, Dessua, Dramapur and other villages or hamlets of Salcete. Of late, as in other parts of Goa, Sarzora too has become a venue for real estate deals.

Institutions
The village church is dedicated to Our Lady of the Assumption, and was set up in 1973.  The village is home to the Assumpta Convent and High School, which is run by the FSMA Catholic nuns. This congregation of the Franciscan Sisters Of St. Mary Of The Angels was founded in 1871 in France.

Distance, constituencies
Sarzora is located about 12 km away from the district headquarters town of Margao. As of 2019, it is part of the Velim assembly constituency and the South Goa parliamentary constituency. It lies near the highway that connects Margao with Canacona and Karwar in the south.

Gallery

External links
Assumpta Convent High School, on Facebook

References

Villages in South Goa district
Comunidades of Goa